Shirase Coast is the north segment of the relatively ill-defined coast along the east side of Ross Ice Shelf and Ross Sea, lying between the north end of Siple Coast (about ) and Cape Colbeck. Named by NZ-APC in 1961 after Lieutenant Nobu Shirase (1861-1946), leader of the Japanese expedition, whose ship Kainan Maru sailed near this coast in January 1912. Landings were made at Kainan Bay and at the Bay of Whales, the origin of a 160-mile journey southeast on Ross Ice Shelf. From  (off Edward VII Peninsula), another party landed for a sledge trip to the edge of the Queen Alexandra Range.

See also
Shirase Bank

References

Coasts of the Ross Dependency
King Edward VII Land